Kováčová is a spa village in Central Slovakia, best known for its hot springs.

History
The village was first mentioned in 1254 as Koachou, and it was standing approximately 2 km west from present-day village. A hot spring was discovered in 1898 and soon after (1899, 1905) was used for spa purposes.

Geography
Kováčová is situated in the Zvolen District of the Banská Bystrica Region in central Slovakia. The village is located in the Zvolen Basin, at the foothills of the Kremnické vrchy mountains, 5 km from Zvolen and 18 km from Banská Bystrica. Kováčová neighbors the spa town of Sliač.

Genealogical resources

The records for genealogical research are available at the state archive "Statny Archiv in Banska Bystrica, Slovakia"

 Roman Catholic church records (births/marriages/deaths): 1692-1880 (parish B)
 Lutheran church records (births/marriages/deaths): 1783-1909 (parish B)

See also
 List of municipalities and towns in Slovakia

References

External links
Official municipal website 
Surnames of living people in Kovacova

Villages and municipalities in Zvolen District
Spa towns in Slovakia